Salesforce management systems (also sales force automation systems (SFA)) are information systems used in customer relationship management (CRM) marketing and management that help automate some sales and sales force management functions.  They are often combined with a marketing information system, in which case they are often called CRM systems.

An SFA, typically a part of a company's CRM system, is a system that automatically records all the stages in a sales process. SFA includes a contact management system which tracks all contact that has been made with a given customer, the purpose of the contact, and any follow up that may be needed. This ensures that sales efforts are not duplicated, reducing the risk of irritating customers. SFA also includes a sales lead tracking system, which lists potential customers through paid phone lists, or customers of related products. Other elements of an SFA system can include sales forecasting, order management and product knowledge. More developed SFA systems have features where customers can actually model the product to meet their needs through online product building systems. This is becoming popular in the automobile industry, where patrons can customize various features such as color and interior features such as leather vs. upholstered seats.

An integral part of any SFA system is company-wide integration among different departments. If SFA systems aren't adopted and properly integrated to all departments, there might be a lack of communication which could result in different departments contacting the same customer for the same purpose. In order to mitigate this risk, SFA must be fully integrated in all departments that deal with customer service management.

Making a dynamic sales force links strategy and operational actions that can take place within a department. the SFA relies on objectives, plans, budget, and control indicators under specific conditions. In order to perform the objectives correctly, specific procedures must be implemented:

Identifiable sales force management processes
 Setting targets and objectives based on inputs (usually via a command center)
 Assigning factors responsible for achieving objectives
 Control processes for ensuring objectives are being achieved within
 a given time frame
 a given constrained context (customers and/or markets)
 System management to handle uncertain environments

The process usually starts with specific sales targets. The command center analyzes the inputs and outputs established from a modeled control process and the sales force. The control process enables the sales force to establish performance standards, measuring actual performance, comparing measured performance against established standards and taking corrective action. The sales managers adjust their actions based on the overall process.

Aside from the control process, the following metrics are implemented:
 Time management – Accurately measures the tasks and the fraction of time needed for each task.
 Call management – Plan for customer interaction accounts for the fraction of command center reps that comply with the process and have successful calls.
 Opportunity management – If the process is followed correctly then a sales opportunity exists. The fraction of command center reps that use the tools, comply with the objective are all measured.
 Account management – For multiple opportunities with a customer the account is measured by the tools, process, and objectives.
 Territory management – For monitoring the account, the territory is measured by the number of account reps and prospective versus active customers.
 Sales force management – Process includes training, IT systems, control, coaching, and is shared across several people and departments.

Five major activities are involved in staffing a sales force. They must be divided into related steps. The first step is to plan the recruiting and selection process. The responsibilities associated with this step are generally assigned to top sales executives, the field sales manager or the human resources manager.  The company wants to determine the number and type of people needed, which involves analyzing the market and the job and preparing a written job description. The qualifications of the job must be established to fill the job. Second, the recruiting phase includes identifying sources of recruits that are consistent with the type of person desired, selecting the source to be used and contacting the recruits. You need to weigh out the options and evaluate its potential effectiveness versus its costs. Third, select the most qualified applicants. The selection phase has three steps, in the planning phase there may be qualifications specified and in the first step it is necessary to design a system for measuring the recruits against the standards from the planning phase. Then the system must be put into effect with the new applicants and then making the actual selection is the final step. The fourth activity is to hire those people who have been selected. Just because one makes an offer does not mean that the job is done. One must convince a recruit that the job offers everything that they need and want to get them to join a company or at least consider it. The fifth activity is to assimilate the new hires into the company. This is done by placing them under direction of an employee in the firm and possibly giving them a mentor to help them feel comfortable working in the firm and going through the training programs.

Components of sales-force automation systems 
Sales-force automation systems vary in their capabilities. They can vary depending on what information an organization needs. The application also has implications based on an organization's size, organization rollup, demand of new system, sales processes, and number of users.

Depending on requirements, services can fall into one of two categories:

 on-premises software 
 on-demand (hosted) software

With on-premises software, the customer manages and purchases the application. On-premises software has some advantages and disadvantages. The disadvantage of on-premises is the higher cost of the software, along with maintenance. Customization is also needed for some who use additional processes outside of the normal out of the box solution. Time is also a factor. Many on-premises software implementations take longer - along with numerous testing and training sessions. The overall advantage of on-premises software relates to overall return on investment. Using the application for three to five years becomes more cost-effective. Another advantage may depend on the amount of data. With on-demand, certain volume restrictions hold, but with on-premises, data restrictions are based on the storage size of local hardware.

CRM is a mechanism which manages all the data of their customers, clients and other business partners in a single container. CRM with cloud computing allows businesses to keep stature of its customers from all its corners.

Several tools can aid in automating sales activities. The largest vendors are Salesforce.com, Microsoft Dynamics CRM, SAP AG and Oracle.

Mobile sales force automation application
Many sales managers are always on the go. The growth of smartphones has reignited the creation of mobile sales force automation systems. Most companies IT departments are aware that adopting new abilities requires extensive testing. Despite the time needed to test such a new product, it will pay off in the future for the sales department. Smartphones appeal to salespeople because they are easy to carry and easy to use, show an appealing interface design, touchscreens and fast wireless network abilities. More than 55% of global 2000 organization will deploy mobile SFA project by 2011 and newer Smartphone platforms, such as Apple's iOS and Google's Android, point to a future of increasing diversity in device selecting and support for sales force. When implementing the mobile sales force automation application or during the first stage of systems development life cycle, project teams will need to evaluate how prospective solutions comprising mobile devices, software and support infrastructure and carrier services are packaged to deliver optimal system usability, manageability and integrative abilities, as well as scalability, reliability and performance.

Encouraging use
Many organizations have found it difficult to persuade sales people to enter data into the system.  For this reason many have questioned the value of the investment. Recent developments have embedded sales process systems that give something back to the seller within the CRM screens.  Because these systems help the sales person plan and structure their selling in the most effective way, increasing productivity, they give a reason to use the CRM.

See also
 :Category:Customer relationship management software
 Information technology management
 Predictive analytics
 Sales Management Systems by Microsoft

References

Sources
 

 
 
 
 

Customer relationship management
Information systems
Personal selling